The 1945–46 William & Mary Indians men's basketball team represented the College of William & Mary in intercollegiate basketball during the 1945–46 NCAA men's basketball season. Under the only year of head coach Sam B. Holt (who concurrently served as the head baseball coach), the team finished the season 10–10 and 5–5 in the Southern Conference. This was the 41st season of the collegiate basketball program at William & Mary, whose nickname is now the Tribe.

The Indians finished in 6th place in the conference and qualified for the 1946 Southern Conference men's basketball tournament, hosted by North Carolina State University at the Thompson Gym in Raleigh, North Carolina, where they lost to Wake Forest in the quarterfinals.

Schedule

|-
!colspan=9 style="background:#006400; color:#FFD700;"| Regular season

|-
!colspan=9 style="background:#006400; color:#FFD700;"| 1946 Southern Conference Tournament

Source

References

William & Mary Tribe men's basketball seasons
William and Mary Indians
William and Mary Indians Men's Basketball Team
William and Mary Indians Men's Basketball Team